Below Zero is a 2021 Spanish action thriller film directed by Lluís Quílez, written by Fernando Navarro and Lluís Quílez. It stars Javier Gutiérrez, Karra Elejalde, Luis Callejo and Patrick Criado. The plot concerns a team of police officers who are transporting prisoners in an armored transport truck who are ambushed by a hijacker, who demands the release of one of the prisoners.

Netflix reported that the movie had been viewed by 47 million accounts in its first month on the service.

Plot

An injured man struggles to escape through a wood at night, but is soon caught by his pursuer. When the victim is unable to tell his attacker the location of a missing woman, the attacker buries him alive. 

Police officer Martín is starting a new job. One of his first duties is to drive a prisoner transport vehicle at night. He will be partnered with Officer Montesino during the transfer of six prisoners. During the strip search of the prisoners prior to departure, Montesino displays an aggressive attitude, deliberately humiliating some of the men. Martín, who believes in obeying the rules, prevents Montesino from striking one of the prisoners. 

The prison transport vehicle is escorted by a police car with two officers, driving ahead. When the transport vehicle enters a foggy patch on the road, Martín loses sight of the police car, as well as radio contact. Then the truck is brought to a sudden stop by a spiked strip lying across the road. Montesino goes outside to assess the situation, but then Martín also loses radio contact with him.

Martín gets out himself to investigate and finds Montesino unconscious and bleeding. Someone then starts shooting at him from the trees. Running for cover, Martín finds the overturned police car with both officers shot dead.

Martín returns fire at the sniper, emptying his gun. He makes it back to the transport vehicle, but is shot in the leg. In the cabin of the truck, he tries to call headquarters, but when the sniper shoots at the windscreen he retreats into the prisoners' section. 

One of the prisoners had earlier managed to access a hidden lock pick, and used it to remove his handcuffs and open his cell. He tries to overpower Martín, but the officer holds him off with his gun. Then gasoline is poured into two of the cells (from tubes through the ventilation grilles) and set alight. Martín has to open the cells to save the prisoners, although one man, Pardo, has already died. 

The freed prisoners open the other cells and Martín is surrounded. He still tries to hold them off with his weapon, but then a message comes through the radio, announcing to the prisoners that Martín's gun is, in fact, empty, and that they should take his key and escape. All, that is, except a young prisoner called Nano, who is wanted by the man who has staged the hijack. Nano responds to this by beating to death another prisoner, Mihai, a foreigner, whom Nano insists has masterminded the whole thing, and that it is nothing to do with him. Nano has also managed to get hold of Martín's key. 

The hijacker, Miguel, who has entered the truck's cabin, sends another radio message, telling the men that if they do not hand over Nano they will all die. A brawl ensues, with the men trying to get the key off Nano, but he swallows it. Martín is overpowered and knocked unconscious by prisoner Ramis. When he comes to, he is locked in an area at one end of the truck, along with Nano, while the other men try to figure out a way to open the exit door. Ramis asks Martín if he remembers him? Apparently he performed in a band at Martín's wedding. 

Miguel starts the truck and begins to drive. In the back, the heating has been turned off and as it is winter the men are freezing. One of the prisoners, Rei, enters a storage compartment under the truck and tries to unscrew a panel. 

However, Montesino, whom Martín had believed to be dead, has begun to revive. Although wounded, he finds Miguel's jeep hidden in the trees. In the glove box is a gun, and also numerous photos of a young woman. Newspaper cuttings reveal her to be Miguel's missing daughter, Soledad "Sole" García. 

Montesino transmits a distress call to headquarters and then drives after the prisoner transport truck. When he catches up with it, he fires through the side window of the cab, but Miguel manages to drive him off the road. Montesino hits a tree, and dies from his injuries. Meanwhile, Rei has also died, having been impaled on a long metal screw in the storage compartment, while the truck was swerving about. 

Inside the truck, Martín talks with Nano, trying to discover what this is all about. Nano insists he does not know. Miguel had mentioned the name Chino in one of his radio messages, and Nano says that this is someone he grew up with, and who is like a brother to him. 

Miguel continues to drive as dawn breaks over the snowy landscape. He drives the truck into the middle of a frozen lake and shoots at the surrounding ice so that the vehicle begins to sink. Then he walks off. As freezing water begins to fill the truck, Martín tells Ramis to release him so that he can reveal an emergency exit. Martín, Nano and Ramis escape through this exit, but the remaining prisoner, Gollum, succumbs to the cold and dies. 

Nano runs off after climbing out of the lake. Ramis and Martín shake hands before they part; Ramis wants to pursue his dream of opening a bar in the Caribbean. Martín makes his way to a nearby village, where he hears gunfire. Miguel is stationed in a high building, firing at Nano, who is hiding in the street below. 

Martín creeps up behind Miguel, but is held off by Miguel's shotgun. Miguel explains why he is doing this; he had allowed his 13 year old daughter Sole to visit a fair with her friend. Nano and his friend Chino separated Sole from her girlfriend, and persuaded her to drink some shots. Unused to alcohol, she was soon drunk and then the boys took turns raping her. They then tortured her, with cigarette butts, pliers and a bottle. Finally they tied her to a car and dragged her through the fields until she died. 

Nano, already a hardened criminal, with numerous jail sentences behind him, was suspected of the crime, but the police could not prove anything. However, Miguel tracked down Chino, who confessed under torture to what they had done - only he did not know where Nano had hidden Sole's body (it was Chino who was buried alive in the opening scene). All Miguel now wants is to retrieve his daughter's body so that he can give her a proper burial. 

Martín says he cannot permit Miguel to kill Nano. Miguel says he understands, as he was once a police officer. The men grapple for the shotgun and Martín overpowers Miguel and takes the weapon, but Miguel runs off in pursuit of Nano. 

Martín follows and finds Miguel beating Nano. Martín makes him back off, whereupon Nano sneers at Miguel, saying he will never reveal the location of his daughter's body. Hearing this, Martín shoots Nano in the foot, and then blasts his hand off, demanding he tell Miguel where Sole is. In agony, Nano finally confesses that she is buried in a well on a farm. As he makes this revelation, a police rescue helicopter arrives.

Martín clears out his locker at headquarters and leaves the building.

Cast

Reception

See also 
 List of Spanish films of 2021

References

External links
 
 
 Below Zero in FilmAffinity
2021 films
2021 action thriller films
Spanish-language Netflix original films
Spanish action thriller films
2020s Spanish-language films
Morena Films films
2020s Spanish films